Mueang Suang is a district (amphoe) of Roi Et province, in northeastern Thailand.

Geography
The district is in the central part of Roi Et Province. Neighboring districts are (from the north clockwise): At Samat, Suwannaphum, Kaset Wisai, Chaturaphak Phiman, and Mueang Roi Et (at a single point).

History
Suang was one of the 11 mueang or city-states subordinate to Mueang Roi Et.

The minor district (king amphoe) was created on 15 March 1973, when the three tambon, Nong Phue, Nong Hin, and Khu Mueang, were split off from Suwannaphum district. It was upgraded to a full district on 25 March 1979.

Administration
The district is divided into five sub-districts (tambons), which are further subdivided into 49 villages (mubans). Mueang Suang has township (thesaban tambon) status and covers tambon Mueang Suang and parts of Nong Phue. There are a further three tambon administrative organization (TAO).

References

External links
amphoe.com

Mueang Suang